Marie-François-Denis-Thérésa Le Roy Allarde better known as Francis baron d'Allarde (12 March 1778 – 4 October 1841) was a 19th-century French chansonnier and playwright.

Biography 
The son of the politician , he was a journalist in the United-States (1794-1796) where he was responsible for a column devoted to good manners in a newspaper of Massachusetts. He graduated from University of Cambridge and returned to France in 1797 with the French legation. He began a career in theater with Arlequin aux Petites Maisons, a play which was given at Théâtre des Troubadours .

His plays, some of which achieved a great success, signed under many pseudonyms (Francis, M. Sapajou, baron d'Allarde...) were presented on the most important Parisian stages of the 19th century including the Théâtre des Variétés, the Théâtre de la Porte-Saint-Martin, and the Théâtre du Vaudeville.

He is buried at Père Lachaise Cemetery (6th division).

Works 

 Arlequin aux Petites Maisons, folie in 1 act and on prose, 1798
 Les Dieux à Tivoli, ou l'Ascension de l'Olympe, folie non fastueuse, arlequinade, impromptu in 1 act and vaudevilles, with Charles-Guillaume Étienne, Morel and Joseph Servières, 1799
 La Martingale, ou le Secret de gagner au jeu, arlequinade-vaudeville in 1 act and in prose, with Joseph Servières, 1801
 Lui-même, one-act opéra comique, 1802
 Caponnet, ou l'Auberge supposée, one-act vaudeville, with René de Chazet, 1804
 C'est ma femme, one-act vaudeville, with Désaugiers, 1804
 Deux pour un, one-act comedy, with de Chazet, 1804
 L'École des Gourmands, one-act vaudeville, with de Chazet and A.-M. Lafortelle, 1804
 L'Hôtel de Lorraine, ou la Mine est trompeuse, one-act proverbe, mingled with vaudevilles, with de Chazet and Lafortelle, 1804
 M. Pistache, ou le Jour de l'an, folie in 1 act, mingled with vaudevilles, with Désaugiers, 1804
 Mylord Go, ou le 18 brumaire, tableau impromptu in 1 act, mingled with vaudevilles, with Désaugiers, 1804
 Oh ! que c'est sciant, ou Oxessian, with Désaugiers, 1804
 L'Un après l'autre, ou les Deux trappes, one-act comedy, mngled with vaudevilles, with Désaugiers, 1804
 Arlequin Musard, ou J'ai le temps, one-act vaudeville-parade in prose, with Marc-Antoine Désaugiers, 1805
 Arlequin tyran domestique, one-act enfantillage, mingled with vaudevilles, with Désaugiers and Tournay, 1805
 Les Chevilles de Maître Adam, menuisier de Nevers, ou les Poètes artisans, one-act comedy, with Commagny, 1805
 Les Femmes colères, one-act divertissement, in prose, mingled with vaudevilles, with Emmanuel Dupaty and Commagny, 1805
 Boileau à Auteuil, comedy in 1 act and in prose, mingled with vaudevilles, with Commagny, 1806
 Faut-il se marier ?, two-act comedy, mingled with vaudevilles, with Lafortelle, 1806
 Gallet, ou le Chansonnier droguiste, one-act comedy, in prose, 1806
 Le Vieux Chasseur, three-act comedy, with Désaugiers, 1806
 Ma tante Urlurette, ou le Chant du coq, one-act folie-vaudeville, with Désaugiers, 1806
 Une matinée du Pont-Neuf, one-act divertissement-parade, mingled with vaudevilles, with Désaugiers, Michel Dieulafoy and Emmanuel Dupaty, 1806
 Mars en Carême, ou l'Olympe au Rocher de Cancale, folie-vaudeville in 1 act and in prose, with Désaugiers, 1806
 Les Bateliers du Niémen, one-act vaudeville, in prose, à l'occasion de la paix, followed by a divertissement, with Désaugiers and Charles-François-Jean-Baptiste Moreau de Commagny, 1807
 Une journée chez Bancelin, one-act comedy, in prose, mingled with vaudevilles, with Commagny, 1807
 Le Loup-garou, comedy in 1 act and in prose, mingled with couplets, with Maurice Ourry, 1807
 Le Panorama de Momus, prologue d'inauguration, in prose and in vaudevilles, for the new salle at the Théâtre des Variétés, with Désaugiers and Commagny, 1807
 M. Giraffe, ou la Mort de l'ours blanc, one-act vaudeville, 1807
 Taconnet chez Ramponneau, ou le Réveillon de la Courtille, one-act comedy folie, in prose mingled with couplets, with Désaugiers and Commagny, 1807
 Comme ça vient et comme ça passe, one-act comedy, mingled with vaudevilles, 1808
 Haine aux hommes, one-act comedy, 1808
 Mincétoff, parodie de Menzikoff, with Désaugiers, 1808
 Jocrisse aux enfers, ou l'Insurrection diabolique, vaudeville infernal in 1 act and in prose, with Désaugiers, 1809
 Le Gâteau des rois, comédie grivoise et poissarde in 1 act, 1809
 Monsieur Brouillon, ou l'Ami de tout le monde, one-act comedy, in prose, 1813
 Les Étourdis en voyage, ou Chacun son tour, comédie en 1 acte, 1814
 L'Homme entre deux âges, one-act comedy, with Sewrin, 1814
 Monsieur Crouton, ou l'Aspirant au Salon, pièce grivoise in 1 act, mingled with couplets, with Lafortelle, 1814
 La Féerie des arts, ou le Sultan de Cachemire, folie-féerie vaudeville in 1 act, with Armand d'Artois and Gabriel de Lurieu, 1819
 Les Visites à Momus, folie-vaudeville in 1 act, with Armand d'Artois and de Lurieu, 1820
 Les Étrennes du vaudeville, ou la Pièce impromptu, folie-parade in 1 act, mingled with couplets, with Désaugiers and Michel-Joseph Gentil de Chavagnac, 1821
 Les Joueurs, ou la Hausse et la baisse, one-act comedy, mingled with couplets, with Lafortelle, 1821
 La Marchande de goujons, ou les Trois Bossus, vaudeville grivois in 1 act, with Armand d'Artois, 1821
 Le Ministériel, satire, 1821
 La Nina de la rue Vivienne, with Armand d'Artois and de Lurieu, 1821
 Monsieur Lerond, comédie-vaudeville in 1 act, with de Lurieu, 1821
 Les Moissonneurs de la Beauce, ou le Soldat laboureur, comédie villageoise in 1 act, mingled with couplets, with Nicolas Brazier and Théophile Marion Dumersan, 1821
 Les Cris de Paris, tableau poissard in 1 act, mingled with couplets, with Armand d'Artois and Antoine Simonnin, 1822
 La Fille mal gardée, ou La coupe des foins, one-act comédie-vaudeville, with Brazier and Dumersan, 1822
 Oreste et Pilade, renewed parody of Favart, à propos Clytemnestre, with Armand d'Artois, 1822
 Les Petits acteurs, ou les Merveilles à la mode, one-act comédie-vaudeville, with Dumersan and Brazier, 1822
 Les Amours de village, one-act vaudeville, with Achille d'Artois, 1823
 L'Enfant de Paris, ou le Débit de consolations, with Armand d'Artois and de Lurieu, 1823
 Polichinelle aux eaux d'Enghien, one-act tableau-vaudeville, with Armand d'Artois and Saintine, 1823
 Le Polichinelle sans le savoir, comédie-parade mingled with couplets, with Armand d'Artois and Jouslin de La Salle, 1823
 Le Fabricant, ou la Filature, one-act comédie-vaudeville, with Brazier, 1823
 Guillaume, Gautier et Garguille, ou le Cœur et la pensée, with Armand d'Artois and de Lurieu, 1823
 Partie et revanche, one-act comédie-vaudeville, with Brazier and Eugène Scribe, 1823
 La Petite Babet, ou les Deux gouvernantes, one-act comédie-vaudeville, with Armand d'Artois, 1823
 La Route de Poissy, one-actvaudeville, with Armand d'Artois, 1823
 Chansons, 1824
 Les deux boxeurs ou les Anglais de Falaise et de Nanterre, folie parade in 1 act mingled with couplets, with Désaugiers and Simonnin, 1824
 La Famille du porteur d'eau, one-act comédie-vaudeville, with Armand d'Artois, 1824
 Les Personnalités, ou le Bureau des cannes, one-act vaudeville épisodique, with de Lurieu and Armand d'Artois, 1824
 L'École des ganaches, with Armand d'Artois and de Lurieu, 1824
 Monsieur Antoine, ou le N̊ 2782, one-act vaudeville, with Saintine, 1824
 Thibaut et Justine, ou le Contrat sur le grand chemin, one-act comédie-anecdotique, mingled with couplets, with Armand d'Artois and de Lurieu, 1824
 Les Ouvriers, ou Les bons enfans, one-act comédie grivoise, mingled with couplets, with Dumersan and Brazier, 1824
 Le Magasin de masques, one-act folie de carnaval, with Brazier and Jouslin de La Salle, 1824
 L'imprimeur sans caractère, ou Le classique et le romantique, with Armand d'Artois and de Lurieu, 1824
 Les Quinze, ou les Déménagements, one-act comédie-vaudeville, with Frédéric de Courcy and Ferdinand Langlé, 1824
 Les Deux Jockos, one-act singerie, mingled with couplets, with Armand d'Artois and Gabriel de Lurieu, 1825
 Le Champenois, ou les Mystifications, one-act comédie-vaudeville, with Achille and Armand d'Artois, 1825
 Les Acteurs à l'auberge, one-act comedy, mingle with couplets, with Armand-François Jouslin de La Salle, 1825
 Le Commissaire du bal, ou l'Ancienne et la nouvelle mode, comédie-anecdote mingled with vaudevilles, in 1 act, with Armand d'Artois, 1825
 La Grand'Maman, ou le Lendemain de noces, one-act comédie-vaudeville, with Achille and Armand d'Artois, 1825
 Les Lorrains, with Armand d'Artois and de Lurieu, 1825
 La Vogue, vaudeville extravaganza, with Maurice Alhoy and Jouslin de La Salle, 1825
 Les Inconvéniens de la diligence, ou Monsieur Bonnaventure, 6 tableaux-vaudeville dans le même cadre, with Armand d'Artois and Théaulon, 1826
 Le Candidat, ou l'Athénée de Beaune, fice-act comédie-vaudeville, with Emmanuel Théaulon, 1826
 Le Capitaliste malgré lui, one-act comédie-vaudeville, with Armand d'Artois and X.-B. Saintine, 1826
 Le Centenaire, ou la Famille des Gaillards, one-act comédie-vaudeville, with Armand d'Artois, 1826
 Les Jolis Soldats, tableau militaire, civil et vaudeville, imitated from Charlet, with Armand d'Artois, 1826
 Le Médecin des théâtres, ou les Ordonnances, one-act tableau épisodique, with Armand d'Artois and Théaulon, 1826
 M. François, ou Chacun sa manie, one-act comedy, mingled with couplets, with Armand d'Artois, 1826
 La Salle des pas perdus, tableau in 1 act and in vaudeville, with Langlé and de Courcy, 1826
 Les Trous à la lune, ou Apollon en faillite, one-act à-propos-folie, with Théaulon and Armand d'Artois, 1826
 Le Protecteur, one-act comédie-vaudeville, with Armand d'Artois and Théaulon, 1826
 Clara Wendel, ou la Demoiselle brigand, two-act comédie-vaudeville, with Théaulon, 1827
 Les Deux Matelots, ou le Père malgré lui, one-act comédie-vaudeville, with Armand d'Artois, 1827
 Les Forgerons, two-act comédie-vaudeville, with Armand and Achille d'Artois, 1827
 La Halle au blé, ou l'Amour et la morale, with Armand d'Artois and Charles Nombret Saint-Laurent, 1827
 L'Homme de Paille, one-act comedy, mingled with vaudeville, with Achille and Armand d'Artois, 1827
 Les Trois faubourgs, ou le Samedi, le dimanche et le lundi, three-act comédie-vaudeville, with Armand d'Artois, 1827
 Les Employés, one-act comédie-vaudeville, with Maurice Alhoy, 1828
 Jean Pacot, ou Cinq Ans d'un conscrit, five-act vaudeville, with Armand d'Artois, 1828
 La Veille et le lendemain, ou Il faut bien aimer son mari, two-act comédie-vaudeville, with Armand and Achille d'Artois, 1828
 Une nuit au Palais-Royal, ou la garde nationale en 1830, one-act tableau vaudeville, with Auguste Anicet-Bourgeois, 1830
 Robespierre ou le 9 thermidor, drama in 3 acts and 9 tableaux, with Bourgeois, 1830
 Le Boa, ou le Bossu à la mode, one-act comédie-vaudeville, with Achille d'Artois and Francis Cornu, 1831
 Tom-Rick, ou le Babouin, three-act play imitated from English, with Armand d'Artois and Cornu, 1832
 Les Enragés, one-act tableau villageois, with Brazier and Armand d'Artois, 1835
 Les Épouseux d'campagne, one-act vaudeville, 1857

Bibliography 
 François-Xavier Feller, Biographie universelle, 1847, (p. 148)
 Louis Gabriel Michaud, Biographie universelle ancienne et moderne, 1859, (p. 265) (Read online) 
 Paul Meunier, Francis d'Allarde, in Bulletin de la société nivernaise des lettres, t.19, 1901, (p. 58-65)
 Charles Weiss, Journal, vol. 2, 1981, (p. 348)
 Ginette Picat-Guinoiseau, Nodier et le théâtre, 1990, (p. 16)

19th-century French dramatists and playwrights
French opera librettists
French chansonniers
1778 births
Writers from Besançon
1841 deaths
Burials at Père Lachaise Cemetery